The International Phycological Society is a learned society of phycologists. It was established in 1960. The Society publishes a bimonthly academic journal Phycologia.

References

External links
 International Phycological Society "Phycologia" website

Learned societies of the United States
Organizations established in 1960